Rejectaria albisinuata is a species of cutworm in the moth family Noctuidae. It is found in North America.

References

Further reading

 

Noctuidae
Articles created by Qbugbot
Moths described in 1905